Levodropropizine is a cough suppressant. It is the levo isomer of dropropizine. It acts as a peripheral antitussive, with no action in the central nervous system. It does not cause side effects such as constipation or respiratory depression which can be produced by opioid antitussives such as codeine and its derivatives.

References 

Antitussives
Phenylpiperazines
Vicinal diols
Enantiopure drugs